Toma Tomas (1924-1996) also known by his nom de guerre Abu Joseph, was an Assyrian politician and the leader of anti-government communist militias (al-Ansar) in northern Iraq during the 1960s and 1970s.

Early life 
Toma Tomas was an ethnic Assyrian born in Alqosh, in 1924, he was an adherent to the Chaldean Catholic Church. He witnessed the Simele massacre first-hand when Assyrians escaped the massacres to Alqosh. This event was crucial in shaping his political ideas in the future.

After finished elementary school in Alqosh, he moved to Mosul where he finished high school and joined the Assyrian levies. He later found his way to Kirkuk to work at an oil company. There he joined the Iraqi Communist Party in the early 1950s.

Struggle against the central government 

He moved to his home town after the 1958 14 July Revolution which brought the communists to power. The situation didn't last long however, the Arab nationalists revolted and the prime minister Abd al-Karim Qasim was executed. The communists where summarily executed and some headed by Toma Tomas fled to the mountains of north of Iraq where they formed armed guerilla’s known as the Ansar and joined the Kurds in their struggle against the central government.

For almost 30 years Toma Tomas led the Ansar in many battles against the Iraqi army in the region stretching from the Turkish borders to Telkepe to the south.

Death 
He died in Syria on 15 October 1996 and was buried at the Chaldean cemetery in Nohadra. His remains were reburied in his home town Alqosh in 2010.

References

External links
Toma Tomas' diaries, Zahrira 

Iraqi guerrillas
Iraqi politicians
1924 births
1996 deaths
Iraqi Communist Party politicians
People from Alqosh
Chaldean Catholics
Iraqi revolutionaries
Iraqi prisoners sentenced to death